George Loosemore (12 September 1619 – 11 September 1682) was an English organist and composer who became organist of Trinity College, Cambridge, in 1660  and of St John's College, Cambridge, in 1661, serving in both roles until his death.

Life 
Baptised at Barnstaple, Devonshire, Loosemore was the son of the organ builder Samuel Loosemore. His brothers included John, also an organ builder, and Henry, a fellow organist.

Loosemore was appointed organist at Trinity College, Cambridge, in 1660 and at St John's College, Cambridge, the following year. He may also have succeeded his brother Henry as resident organist and teacher of music at Kirtling, Cambridgeshire, under the patronage of Dudley North, 4th Baron North.

He died in Cambridge.

Works 
Surviving works include the anthem Glory be to God in the collection of music compiled by Thomas Tudway.

References

1619 births
1682 deaths
17th-century English composers
English organists
People associated with the University of Cambridge